Adrian Charles Edmondson (born 24 January 1957) is an English actor, comedian, musician, writer and television presenter. He was part of the alternative comedy boom in the early 1980s and had roles in the television series The Young Ones (1982–1984) and Bottom (1991–1995), which he wrote together with his collaborator Rik Mayall. Edmondson also appeared in The Comic Strip Presents... series of films throughout the 1980s and 1990s. For one episode of this he created the spoof heavy metal band Bad News, and for another he played his nihilistic alter-ego Eddie Monsoon, an offensive South African television star.

He played the lead role in the Comic Strip's 1985 feature film, The Supergrass. In the 2000s, Edmondson appeared in numerous TV programmes in drama roles including Jonathan Creek, Holby City, Miss Austen Regrets, as himself on Hell's Kitchen and created the sitcom Teenage Kicks. Since 2006, Edmondson has concentrated increasingly on music instead of acting. He formed a folk punk band, the Bad Shepherds, singing and playing mandola and mandolin, and performed and wrote for the Bonzo Dog Doo Dah Band. In 2011, he presented a series of shows for ITV: The Dales, which focused on people working in the Yorkshire Dales, and Ade in Britain in which he undertook a tour of numerous places in Britain. In 2013, Edmondson was crowned the winner of Celebrity Masterchef, and from 2019 to 2020, he appeared in the BBC soap opera EastEnders as Daniel Cook. In 2022, he also played Ebenezer Scrooge in the current run of the Royal Shakespeare Company's adaptation of A Christmas Carol.

Early life
The second of four children, Adrian Charles Edmondson was born on 24 January 1957 in Bradford, West Riding of Yorkshire to Dorothy Eileen Sturgeon (born 1930) and Fred Edmondson (1929–2014). As a child, Edmondson lived with his family in a variety of places including Cyprus, Bahrain, and Uganda, where his father was a teacher in the armed forces. In the mid-1980s, his father became the deputy headmaster at the former Drummond Middle School in Manningham, Bradford. Edmondson attended Pocklington School, East Riding of Yorkshire from 1968 to 1975. In an interview with the Times Educational Supplement, he stated that he did not enjoy his education at Pocklington.

Edmondson calculated that during his time at Pocklington, he received a total of 66 strokes of the cane as well as frequent slipperings. By the time he was in sixth form, with his parents working abroad, Edmondson began to enjoy himself, "which involved lots of drinking and smoking and petty acts of vandalism." He made some good friends at the school and had a favourite teacher, Michael Aubrey. 

Aubrey taught English and encouraged Edmondson to pursue drama, casting him in a number of school plays, and allowing him to take time out of other lessons to do drama. After Pocklington, Edmondson went to the University of Manchester to study drama, where he met his future comedy partner Rik Mayall, and graduated with a 2:1 degree. Edmondson and Mayall soon became best friends and before long found work on the burgeoning alternative comedy scene.

Career

1980s
Under the name 20th Century Coyote, Edmondson and Mayall became one of the star attractions at The Comedy Store.  As their popularity grew, Edmondson, Mayall and other upcoming comedians, including Nigel Planer, Peter Richardson, Alexei Sayle, and French and Saunders moved from the Comedy Store to The Comic Strip club. The Comic Strip soon gained a reputation as one of the most popular comedy clubs in London and soon came to the attention of Channel 4. Edmondson and the others were commissioned to act in 6 self-contained half-hour films, using the group as comedy actors rather than stand-up performers. The series, titled The Comic Strip Presents... debuted on 2 November 1982 (the opening night of Channel 4). The first episode to be broadcast was "Five Go Mad in Dorset", a parody of Enid Blyton's Famous Five, which drew anger from some viewers for the way it mercilessly satirised a children's classic. Edmondson starred as one of the five.

By the same time as The Comic Strip Presents... was being negotiated, the BBC signed Edmondson, Mayall, Richardson, Planer, and Sayle to star in The Young Ones, a sitcom in the same anarchic style as The Comic Strip. (Richardson later decided not to proceed and was replaced by Christopher Ryan.) The show revolved around the shared house where four students lived during their studies at Scumbag College. It was noted at the time of its first airing for its violent slapstick, and the series retains a cult following.  During this time, Edmondson also appeared in a bank advertisement in what was basically his "Vyvyan" guise. Following the success of The Comic Strip Presents... and, to a greater extent, The Young Ones, Edmondson and Mayall returned to their "Coyote" dynamic in the double act the Dangerous Brothers with Edmondson as "Sir Adrian Dangerous" in Saturday Live (1985–1987). In 1983, he appeared as the lead singer "Vim Fuego" in the spoof heavy metal band called "Bad News" with his Young Ones co-stars Rik Mayall, Nigel Planer, and Peter Richardson of "Comic Strip Presents...".

In 1985 Edmondson starred with his wife Jennifer Saunders in Happy Families, a rural comedy drama written by Ben Elton, which appeared on the BBC and told the story of the dysfunctional Fuddle family.

In 1987, Edmondson reunited with Planer and Mayall to star in Filthy Rich and Catflap, a comic attack on showbiz, again written by Elton. He played "Edward Catflap", a coarse, drunken minder of light-entertainment nonentity "Richie Rich".  In this show Edmondson displayed the same slapstick characteristics as Vyvyan in The Young Ones but was closer in personality to his later character "Eddie Hitler" in Bottom. The show was cancelled after one series.  Edmondson was also slated to make a guest appearance along Mayall in the fifth episode of the ITV sit-com Hardwicke House.  Due to the adverse reaction of both press and viewers, however, ITV withdrew the series after showing only two episodes and the remaining episodes -- including Edmonson's scheduled guest appearance in episode 5 -- have never been shown.

In 1988, Edmondson released a follow up to How To Be A Complete Bastard called The Bastard's Book of the Worst. In 1989 he made an appearance in an episode of Blackadder Goes Forth as the Red Baron, nemesis to Mayall's character, Lord Flashheart.

1990s
Edmondson played Brad Majors in the 1990 West End run of The Rocky Horror Show, alongside Tim McInnerny as Frank-N-Furter and Ed Tudor-Pole as Riff-Raff. He also appears on the soundtrack album of the production. In 1991, he teamed with his comedy partner Rik Mayall once more, this time co-writing and co-starring in their own sitcom, Bottom. Edmondson starred as "Edward Elizabeth Hitler" opposite Mayall's "Richard Richard". The series featured the slapstick, crude humour for which the pair had become famous but with more in-depth character analysis.

Edmondson played Estragon to Mayall's Vladimir in Samuel Beckett's play Waiting for Godot in the West End, in a production that opened at the Queen's Theatre on 30 September 1991.  Bottom became very popular, but it was criticised for its often vulgar humour. The show was also turned into five UK stage tours (1993, 1995, 1997, 2001 and 2003).

In 1993, Edmondson starred alongside Richard Briers in a black comedy called If You See God, Tell Him. Edmondson played Gordon Spry, whose uncle (Briers) is paralysed and has a greatly reduced attention span. His erratic behaviour causes problems for Gordon. The series comprised four episodes, each 45 minutes long, and only broadcast once. The BBC has not repeated the series, although one episode was broadcast on BBC Four on 3 December 2007.

In September 1995, Edmondson released his first (comic) novel, The Gobbler. In 1996, he played the role of Ace Face/Bellboy at the Who's performance of Quadrophenia at London's Hyde Park. A video game called Animal, featuring Peperami's "the animal", was released the same year, with the character being voiced by Edmondson. From 1997 to 1998 he voiced engine stoker Jones, a major character in the animated series Captain Star. In the 1998 ITV pantomime Jack and the Beanstalk, Edmondson played Jack's mother Dame Dolly alongside Neil Morrissey, Denise Van Outen, Paul Merton, Julian Clary and Julie Walters.

2000s
Edmondson appeared regularly as Brendan Baxter in Series 4 of the BBC mystery series Jonathan Creek, broadcast in 2003–2004. He had a lead role playing an NHS doctor in the comedy series Doctors and Nurses first broadcast in early 2004. In Surviving Disaster, a BBC docudrama about the 1986 Chernobyl disaster, broadcast at the start of 2006, Edmondson played the role of Valery Legasov. In 2005 he appeared as a celebrity model on Star Portraits with Rolf Harris. That year, he also competed on "Comic Relief Does Fame Academy" where he made it to the finale and came in 3rd place. From 2005 to 2008 he appeared as Percy "Abra" Durant in the medical drama Holby City. In 2008 he played Henry Austen in the BBC produced film Miss Austen Regrets and Vernon in the ITV sitcom Teenage Kicks. In April 2009 he appeared on the cooking show Hell's Kitchen, where he reached the final, coming second to Linda Evans.

Edmondson played the role of Captain Hook in the Canterbury Marlowe Arena pantomime during its Christmas 2009 run.

2010s
In an August 2010 edition of Radio 4's Chain Reaction programme he said to Lee Mack that he had not really quit but was focusing more on music and farming. He also said that he and Mayall often spoke of a reunion when they are old men, or in fifteen years' time.  Mayall appeared during Edmondson's winning performance of The Dying Swan on BBC One's Let's Dance for Comic Relief on 5 March 2011, and in September 2011, Edmondson appeared on the Sunday morning cooking show Something for the Weekend and told presenter Tim Lovejoy that he and Rik Mayall were planning to reunite and make another series of Bottom, set in an old people's home.

In 2011, Edmondson hosted the ITV documentary series The Dales, in which he followed a number of families who live and work in the Yorkshire Dales, including the "Yorkshire Shepherdess" Amanda Owen. He also presented the ITV series Ade in Britain that year, where he travelled to different parts of the United Kingdom in a Mini Countryman towing a small caravan, often including a performed segment from local folk singers. A second series followed in 2013.

Edmondson appeared on the BBC One series That's Britain! 2011. In each episode, his task was to report as an "insider" in how a region of Britain works. A one-off special, Britain Beware, about the history of British public information films, was hosted by Edmondson and aired on ITV on 7 May 2012.

In August 2012, the BBC announced plans for a 2013 television adaptation of Edmondson and Mayall's 1997 Hooligan's Island tour, but Edmondson announced later that year that he had pulled out of the project to pursue other interests. Mayall, Edmondson's long-time creative partner, died on 9 June 2014.

Edmondson had a minor role in the 2012 film Blood. Edmondson and Saunders reunited with their former Comic Strip colleagues in 2012 for a Famous Five sequel, Five Go to Rehab. It aired on 7 November on Gold.

Edmondson won the 2013 BBC One cookery series of Celebrity MasterChef. In 2014, Edmondson presented Ade at Sea, a factual six-part programme for the ITV network which follows Ade in Britain. In 2014, he played DCI Warner in the three-part  mini-series Prey.

He played the role of Gordon in the 2013 Chichester Festival Theatre production of Neville's Island. In 2014, he reprised the role for the show's West End run. In 2015, Edmondson voiced Stanley the Dachshund in adverts for health and life insurance company Vitality.

In 2016, Edmondson took part in episode 4 of The Great Sport Relief Bake Off and won the title of Star Baker. From 2 November to 3 December 2016 Edmondson starred in an adaptation of William Leith's bestseller Bits Of Me Are Falling Apart at the Soho Theatre, London.

Edmondson's children's book Tilly and the Time Machine was published on 4 May 2017. From November 2017 into 2018, Edmondson played the character of Malvolio in the Royal Shakespeare Company's production of Shakespeare's Twelfth Night. Also in 2017, Edmondson appeared as Captain Peavey in the eighth film of the Star Wars series, The Last Jedi, a casting decision made by the film's director Rian Johnson, a self-proclaimed fan of Edmondson's work in The Young Ones and Bottom.

In September 2018, Edmondson featured as Sergeant Dogberry in the episode "Sigh No More" of Ben Elton's Upstart Crow. From September 2018 to November 2018, Edmondson toured with Nigel Planer in a play that they wrote together called Vulcan 7. In 2019, Edmondson appeared in EastEnders as Daniel Cook.

Filmography

Film

Television

Video games

Theatre

Narration

Music career
In 1984, Edmondson formed the spoof Heavy Metal band Bad News as part of The Comic Strip Presents... series with Comic Strip regulars Rik Mayall, Nigel Planer and Peter Richardson. The band proved popular, and they released two singles (neither of which reached the top 40) and two studio albums. They also played a series of small gigs around the country, culminating in their performance at the Monsters of Rock festival in 1986.

In 1986, Edmondson achieved a number one hit in the UK Singles Chart when he and his co-stars from The Young Ones teamed up with Cliff Richard to record a new version of "Living Doll" for the inaugural Comic Relief campaign. Despite having been killed off in the final episode of the series, Edmondson played Vyvyan one last time in the video. The same year he co-wrote the book How to be a Complete Bastard together with Mark Leigh and Mike Lepine.

Edmondson has directed pop videos for "Fiesta" (1988) by the Pogues, "Prime Mover" (1987) by Zodiac Mindwarp, "Like the Weather" (1988) by 10,000 Maniacs, "Please Help the Cause Against Loneliness" (1988) by Sandie Shaw and "Hourglass" by Squeeze (1987). The latter won Best Video at the MTV awards.

He also directed and appeared in "International Rescue" (1989) by Fuzzbox and appeared in the music video "Terry" (1983) by Kirsty MacColl. 

In 1991, Edmondson formed the Bum Notes, who were a jazz instrumental band and conceived exclusively to perform theme music for Bottom.

A fan of the Bonzo Dog Doo Dah Band, Edmondson performed vocals with them as part of their 2006 reformation and countrywide tour. He also contributed vocals and writing for their 2007 album Pour l'Amour des Chiens.

Together with Maartin Allcock, Andy Dinan and Troy Donockley, Edmondson founded the band the Bad Shepherds in 2008, performing punk and new wave classics on traditional folk instruments. The band released three albums and first toured in 2009, playing at places such as the Trowbridge Village Pump Festival. The Bad Shepherds also headlined the first ever Looe Music Festival in 2011. They disbanded in October 2016.

In 2010, he founded the Idiot Bastard Band with Simon Brint, Rowland Rivron, Neil Innes and Phill Jupitus. The Idiot Bastard Band perform original comedy songs as well as cover versions, and their shows often feature guest performers. The group continued to perform following the death of Brint in 2011.

Discography
Albums

Non-album songs

Personal life
Edmondson married comedian Jennifer Saunders on 11 May 1985. They have three daughters, musician Ella, actress Beattie, and designer/stylist Freya. He is a supporter of Exeter City.

References

External links

 
 
 

1957 births
Living people
20th-century English male actors
21st-century English male actors
Alumni of the Victoria University of Manchester
Audiobook narrators
British male comedy actors
British mandolinists
British surrealist artists
British surrealist writers
Comedians from Yorkshire
English comedy writers
English male comedians
English male film actors
English male musicians
English male television actors
Male actors from Bradford
Male actors from Yorkshire
Musicians from Bradford
People educated at Pocklington School
Reality cooking competition winners
The Comic Strip